Rugby Rovigo Delta, formerly known until 2010 as Rugby Rovigo, is an Italian rugby union club currently competing in the Top10.
They are based in Rovigo, in Veneto.
The club was founded in 1935 by medical student Dino Lanzoni, who discovered rugby at university.
They quickly became one of the strongest Italian sides and won 13 titles between 1951 and 2021. They have never been relegated from the top flight of Italian rugby union. They are the current Italian champion.

Current and former Rovigo players include Elio De Anna, Stefano Bettarello, Stefano Bordon, Alessandro Moscardi, Carlo Orlandi, Carlo Checchinato, Mirco Bergamasco, Manuel Contepomi, AJ Venter, Gert Smal, Viliami Ofahengaue and  Naas Botha.

Honours
 Italian championship
 Champions (13): 1950–51, 1951–52, 1952–53, 1953–54, 1961–62, 1962–63, 1963–64, 1975–76, 1978–79, 1987–88, 1989–90, 2015–16, 2020–21
 Runners-up (7): 1988–89, 1991–92, 2010–11, 2013–14, 2014–15, 2016–17, 2018–19, 2021−22
 Coppa Italia/Excellence Trophy
 Champions (1): 2019-20
 Runners-up (3): 1997–98, 2005–06, 2013−14

Current squad
The Rovigo Delta senior squad for 2022–23 is:

Selected former players

Italian players
Former players who have played for Rovigo and have caps for Italy:

 Matías Agüero
 Mario Battaglini
 Enzo Bellinazzo
 Arturo Bergamasco
 Mirco Bergamasco
 Ottorino Bettarello
 Romano Bettarello
 Stefano Bettarello
 Flaviano Brizzante
 Massimo Brunello
 Stefano Bordon
 Giancarlo Busson
 Pablo Canavosio
 Carlo Checchinato
 David Dal Maso
 Elio De Anna
 Gianluca Faliva
 Simone Favaro
– Julian Gardner
 Massimo Giovanelli
 Andrea Lo Cicero
 Tito Lupini
 Giancarlo Malosti
 Matteo Mazzantini
 Alessandro Moscardi
 Giancarlo Navarrini
 Giacomo Nicotera
 Carlo Orlandi
 Alberto Osti
 Antonio Pavanello
 Gert Peens
 Isidoro Quaglio
 Graziano Ravanelli
 Pietro Reale
 Andrea Scanavacca
 Fabrizio Sintich
 Pietro Stievano
 Edgardo Venturi
 Angelo Visentin
 Narciso Zanella

Overseas players
Former players who have played for Rovigo and have caps for their respective country:

 Peter FitzSimons
 Willie Ofahengaue
 Alejandro Abadie
 Manuel Contepomi
 Juan Cruz Legora
 Leandro Lobrauco
 Serafín Dengra
 Juan Pablo Orlandi
– Christian Stewart
 Akvsenti Giorgadze
 Ilia Zedginidze
 Gheorghe Gajion
 Ron Cribb
 Alexandru Penciu
 Cristian Săuan
 Nick Mallett
 Stefan Basson
 Schalk Van der Merwe
 Schalk Burger Sr.
 Hendro Scholtz
 Naas Botha
 Gert Smal
 AJ Venter
 Silao Leaega
 Elvis Seveali'i
 Luke Gross
 Bernard Thomas

References

External links
 Official site

Italian rugby union teams
1935 establishments in Italy
Rugby clubs established in 1935
Rovigo
Sport in Veneto